The Sahel River is a river in northern Algeria, which flows into the Soummam River at Akbou. The basin of the Sahel River (wilaya of Bouira)is about 3,750 km.

References

Rivers of Algeria 
Bodies of water of Algeria
Landforms of Algeria